Rudi Ceyssens (19 July 1962 – 20 December 2015) was a Belgian cyclist. He competed in three events at the 1984 Summer Olympics.

References

External links
 

1962 births
2015 deaths
Belgian male cyclists
Cyclists at the 1984 Summer Olympics
Olympic cyclists of Belgium
People from Beringen, Belgium
Cyclists from Limburg (Belgium)